Field hockey at the 2004 Summer Olympics was held at the Olympic Hockey Centre located within the Helliniko Olympic Complex. The competitions for both men and women was split into two groups with the top two teams after the preliminary rounds progressing through to the semi-finals.

Men's tournament

Preliminary round

Pool A

Pool B

Medal round

Final standings

Women's tournament

Preliminary round

Pool A

Pool B

Medal round

Final standings

Medal summary

Medal table

Medalists

References

External links
Official result book – Hockey

 
2004 Summer Olympics events
O
Field hockey at the Summer Olympics
2004 Summer Olympics